Ovidio Bolognesi (c 1931 – August 2016) was an Italian professional golfer. He was one of the leading Italian golfers of the 1950s and 1960s, representing Italy four times in the World Cup. He was the professional at Turin Golf Club La Mandria for many years from 1957. His sons Emanuele and Massimo were also professional golfers.

Professional wins (1)
1963 Italian Native Open

Team appearances
World Cup (representing Italy): 1960, 1962, 1963, 1964
Joy Cup (representing the Rest of Europe): 1956

References

Italian male golfers
Sportspeople from Rome
1930s births
2016 deaths